Gun Lake, often spelled Gunn Lake and also known as Big Gun Lake, is a lake and unincorporated community in the Bridge River Country of the West-Central Interior of British Columbia, Canada, located 5 miles northwest of the community of Gold Bridge. It is approximately 6 km in length and is roughly pistol-shaped when seen from above, and drains via a short connecting creek to Gun Creek, which is an important tributary of the Bridge River, joining it via Carpenter Lake. Lajoie Lake, which is just southwest, is also known as Little Gun Lake and is also a small community.  The two together are generally referred to as the Gun Lakes.

"Big Gun" has a summer population around 100 and has a full-time population of approx 20 people and constitutes one of the main communities of the Bridge River Valley, the others being Gold Bridge and the mining ghost town of Bralorne, and a smaller recreational community in the area of Tyaughton Lake and Gun Creek Road, which runs west from that lake on the north flank of Gun Creek.

According to a newspaper article from 1941 written by an early prospector and currently posted in an old mining cabin in Bralorne, Gun Lake and Gun Creek were named because a prospector once lost his Gun in Gun Creek.

See also
Gunn (disambiguation)
Gunn Valley

References

Lakes of British Columbia
Bridge River Country
Unincorporated settlements in British Columbia
Populated places in the Squamish-Lillooet Regional District